Mirificarma rhodoptera is a moth of the family Gelechiidae. It is found in Romania, Greece, Turkey, Israel and Lebanon.

The wingspan measures 5-7.5 mm for males and 5.5–7 mm for females. There are two forms, a small and large form. The head is mid-brown. The forewings are mottled light brown, very faintly pink-tinged, and dark brown. Adults of the large form (typical form) are found in June and July, those of the small form in May and June.

References

Moths described in 1866
Mirificarma
Moths of Europe
Moths of Asia